Charles Warner (1846–1909) was an English stage actor.

Charles Warner may also refer to:

 Charles Dudley Warner (1829–1900), American essayist and novelist
 Charles J. Warner (1875–1955), American politician
 Charles Frederick Warner (1967–2015), American convicted murderer
 Charles Warner (English cricketer), (born 1938), English cricketer
 Charles Warner (Trinidadian cricketer) (1841–1911), Trinidadian cricketer
 Charles William Warner (1805–1887), Trinidadian lawyer